Kentucky Route 91 (KY 91) is a  state highway that traverses three counties in western Kentucky. It begins in Hopkinsville, Kentucky and ends at the Ohio River, the Kentucky-Illinois state line in northern Crittenden County.

Route description

Hopkinsville to Princeton
It begins at a junction with U.S. Route 68 and Kentucky Route 80 in Hopkinsville, Kentucky, the Christian County seat. It crosses KY-1682, the Hopkinsville By-Pass before leaving town. It goes on a northwesterly path, and its junction with Kentucky Route 398 is KY 91's access point to Pennyrile Forest State Resort Park.

KY 91 enters Caldwell County, and then it would meet Kentucky Routes 139 and 293, along with US 62 in downtown Princeton. It then traverses Interstate 69 on the northwest outskirts of Princeton.

Princeton to Cave-in-Rock
KY 91 meets Kentucky Route 70 and then U.S. Route 641 at Fredonia, a community northwest of Princeton. KY 70, KY 91, and US 641 then run concurrently from there into Crittenden County. KY 70 departs from US 641/KY 91 at a point north of the Crittenden-Caldwell County line, while KY 91 remains with US 641 until the U.S. Route's northern terminus at the U.S. Route 60 junction at Kentucky. For a few blocks, KY 91 runs concurrently with US 60, and then KY 91 goes further north to reach its northern terminus at the Cave-In-Rock Ferry on the Ohio River, which also marks the Kentucky-Illinois state line. It becomes Illinois State Highway 1 upon entry into Hardin County, Illinois.

Major intersections

References

0091
0091
0091
0091